Milica Nikolić may refer to:
 Milica Nikolić (politician)
 Milica Nikolić (judoka)